Daisy Fellowes (née Marguerite Séverine Philippine Decazes de Glücksberg; 29 April 1890, in Paris – 13 December 1962, in Paris) was a prominent French socialite, acclaimed beauty, minor novelist and poet, Paris editor of American Harper's Bazaar, fashion icon, and an heiress to the Singer sewing machine fortune.

Parents and childhood
Born in Paris, France, she was the only daughter of Isabelle-Blanche Singer (1869–1896) and Jean Élie Octave Louis Sévère Amanien Decazes de Glücksberg (1864–1912), 3rd Duke Decazes and Duke of Glücksberg. Her maternal grandfather was Isaac Singer, the American sewing machine pioneer. After her mother's suicide, she and her siblings were largely raised by their maternal aunt, Winnaretta Singer (Princess Edmond de Polignac), a noted patron of the arts, particularly music.

First marriage
Her first husband, whom she married on 10 May 1910 in Paris, was Jean Amédée Marie Anatole de Broglie, Prince de Broglie (born in Paris on 27 January 1886). He reportedly died of influenza on 20 February 1918 while serving with the French Army in Mascara, Algeria, though malicious observers gossiped that he actually committed suicide as a result of his homosexuality having been exposed.

Their country estate was Compton Beauchamp House in Oxfordshire, where they raised three daughters: 
 
 Princess Emmeline Isabelle Edmée Séverine de Broglie (Neuilly, 16 February 1911 – Onez, Switzerland, 10 September 1986). Married to Marie Alexandre William Alvar de Biaudos, Comte de Castéja (Paris, 6 April 1907 – Paris, 6 July 1983) in Neuilly, 8 November 1932. Accused of collaboration during World War II, Emmeline de Castéja spent five months in the prison at Fresnes, France. 
 Princess Isabelle Marguerite Jeanne Pauline de Broglie (Lamorlaye, 27 July 1912 – Geneva, 18 July 1960). Married to Olivier Charles Humbert Marie, Marquis de La Moussaye (La Poterie, 26 Mars 1908 – Paris, 20 October 1988) in Neuilly, 3 June 1931. Divorced in Paris, 13 April 1945. Isabelle de La Moussaye was a novelist. 

 
 Princess Jacqueline Marguerite de Broglie (Paris, 5 January 1918 – Crans-Montana, Valais 26 February 1965). Married to Alfred Ignaz Maria Kraus (Sarajevo, 28 November 1908–) in Neuilly, France, 6 October 1941. Divorced in Münster, 3 February 1958. After her husband—a Siemens electronics senior manager who served as a counter-espionage agent with the Abwehr— was accused of betraying members of the French Resistance during World War II to protect his wife, also a member of the Resistance, Jacqueline Kraus had her head shaved as punishment. 

Of her Broglie children, the notoriously caustic Fellowes once said, "The eldest, Emmeline, is like my first husband only a great deal more masculine; the second, Isabelle, is like me without guts; [and] the third, Jacqueline, was the result of a horrible man called Lischmann ...."

Second marriage
Her second husband, whom she married on 9 August 1919 in London, was The Hon. Reginald Ailwyn Fellowes (1884–1953), of Donnington Grove. He was a banker, cousin of Winston Churchill and the son of William Fellowes, 2nd Baron de Ramsey.

They had one child, Rosamond Daisy Fellowes (1921–1998). She married her first husband in 1941 (divorced 1945), Captain James Gladstone, and had one son, James Reginald (born 1943). She married her second husband in 1953 (divorced), Tadeusz Maria Wiszniewski (1917–2005); they had one daughter, Diana Marguerite Mary Wiszniewska (born 1953).

Affairs
Among Fellowes's lovers was Duff Cooper, the British ambassador to France. She also attempted to seduce Winston Churchill, but failed, shortly before marrying his cousin Reginald Fellowes.

Literary works
Fellowes wrote several novels and at least one epic poem. Her best-known work is Les dimanches de la comtesse de Narbonne (1931, published in English as "Sundays"). She also wrote the novel Cats in the Isle of Man.

Status as fashion icon
She was known as one of the most daring fashion plates of the 20th century, arguably the most important patron of the surrealist couturier Elsa Schiaparelli. She was also a friend of the jeweller Suzanne Belperron, and she was a longtime customer of the jeweller Cartier.

Death
Daisy Fellowes died on 13 December 1962 at her hôtel particulier in Paris at number 69, rue de Lille.

See also
 Duke of Decazes
 House of Broglie
 Baron de Ramsey
 Carlos de Beistegui

References

Further reading

External links
Voguepedia Personalities Daisy Fellowes
  Photos of Daisy Fellowes in National Portrait Gallery by Cecil Beaton

1890 births
1962 deaths
French nobility
Socialites from Paris
British socialites
Daisy
People from Vale of White Horse (district)
People from Shaw-cum-Donnington